Podenco Canario (In English: Canary Island Podenco, Canary Island Hound, or Canarian Warren Hound) is a breed of dog from the Canary Islands. The Podenco Canario is still used today, primarily in packs, most often for the sport hunting of rabbits. The word "podenco" in Spain refers to a certain type of dog, typically rabbit hunters with the same body shape. "Canario" is a reference to its region of origin, the Canary Islands.  The Spanish Kennel Club, Real Sociedad Canina de España, recognises the following similar dog breeds that use the identifier "podenco" in their names: Podenco Andaluz, Podenco Ibicenco, and Podenco Valenciano.
ge

Appearance 

The Podenco Canario is a very agile, slender and lightly built but sturdy dog.  There are two distinct sizes of Podenco Canarios.  One is similar to the Ibizan Hound, medium in size, with height at the withers approximately 55 to 64 cm (21.7 to 25.2 ins) for males, females are slightly smaller. Sizes vary with the terrain on which the dog hunts. A second smaller size Podenco Canario has been recognised within the Canary Islands, with height at the withers approximately 30 to 40 cm for males, females slightly smaller.  The short, dense coat should be some shade of red, white, or a combination of red and white, depending on the island and, in some cases, the specific area on some of the islands. There should be no other colour on the coat, or indeed anywhere on the body, as even the dog's nose, nails and skin should be a shade of red, and they are even known to "blush" when excited. The neck is long, the head is longer than it is wide, and the large ears are carried fully up. The long tail is usually seen low set but can be raised. The tail is not carried too high when moving. The dog should move in an extended and agile trot. Faults, which indicate that a particular dog should not be bred, include aspects of appearance as well as structural faults that would prevent the dog's ability to move and hunt, such as cow hocks, and crossing of the fore and hind legs at a trot.

It is a slightly elongated and very muscular dog with a brown (chocolate), red, or yellow coat, can be accompanied by white, brown, or tan markings, and usually have short fur. They begin to demonstrate hunting instinct in as little as 3 months but can take up to 14 months to develop. When it is pursuing prey, they emit a characteristic staccato repetitive barking, known to some local hunters as "song of the rabbit".

History 
The Podenco Canario is found on all of the Canary Islands. The legend is that it had descended from ancient dogs brought to the islands in antiquity from North Africa by the earliest human settlers and isolated there. However, recent genetics studies have concluded that the Podenco is a type of dog more closely related to, and no more primitive than, the rest of the European hunting breeds.

A DNA study found that there was evidence of gene flow from the Podenco Canario into the Cirneco dell'Etna from Sicily.

Current use 
Many foreign nationals and foreign organisations export abandoned and unwanted dogs, and the Podenco Canario forms a large percentage of these dogs.
The Podenco Canario is recognised by La Real Sociedad Canina de España (R.S.C.E., the Spanish Kennel Club) as an indigenous breed and is recognised internationally  by the Fédération Cynologique Internationale as breed number 329 in Group 5 Spitz and primitive types, Section 7 : Primitive type - Hunting Dogs, Spain. In North America the breed is listed with the United Kennel Club as a hunting dog in their sighthound & pariah breed group. The breed is also recognized by a number of minor registries, hunting clubs, and internet-based dog registry businesses. Exported from its homeland, it is promoted as a rare breed for those seeking a unique pet.

Health and temperament 
Podencos have few health problems.  They suffer more often from injury while hunting than disease or predisposition to illnesses.  A sexual-development genetic disorder was observed in one dog of this breed, s.p. testicular/ovotesticular disorder, which can result in dogs that are genetically female (XX) developing testes or ovotestes instead of ovaries. This disorder was formerly referred to as SRY-negative XX sex reversal, and is more commonly documented in American and English Cocker Spaniels.

The breed standard states that the typical behaviour is "nervy, agitated, and of an enthusiastic dynamism".

Nomenclature and recognition 
Within Spain all five types of Podencos are recognised by the people: the Podenco Ibicenco, Mallorquín, Menorquín, Andaluz, and Canario.  But while the UKC of the United Kingdom recognises the Podenco Canario and obviously uses the word "podenco" in its naming convention, it recognise the Podenco Ibicenco as an "Ibizan Hound" and fails to maintain the clarification of "podenco". The AKC of the US also recognises the "Ibizan Hound" as such but as of yet does not recognise the Canary Island Podenco.
Many bilingual speakers within Spain, including some veterinarians familiar with the recent history of these dogs believe a more correct naming convention should include the word "podenco", of which one breed would be the Ibizan Podenco.

Similar breeds 
Breeds also listed in Group 5/Section 7 include the
Ibizan Hound, Cirneco dell'Etna, Portuguese Podengo, Pharaoh Hound and the Thai Ridgeback.

See also
 Dogs portal
 List of dog breeds

References

External links 

FCI breeds
Dog breeds originating in the Canary Islands
Sighthounds
Rare dog breeds